Sagara may refer to:

People

 Sagara (ethnic group), a people of Tanzania
 Sagara (Vedic king), Ikshvaku dynasty
 Sagara clan, a clan of 16th century Japan
 Sekihotai (Sagara Souzou), a leader of the Sekihotai military unit during the Boshin War
, Japanese samurai
 Sousuke Sagara, the protagonist of the anime and manga series Full Metal Panic
 Sanosuke Sagara, a fictional character in the manga and anime series Rurouni Kenshin
 Sāgara (Dragon King), one of the eight dragon kings (Hachidai ryuuou) of Buddhism
 Brendan Sagara, American baseball coach
 Michelle Sagara, an author who also writes under the pseudonyms of Michelle West and Michelle Sagara West

Places
 Sagara, Shimoga District, a city in Shimoga District in Karnataka, India
Sagar (Vidhana Sabha constituency)
 Sagar, Yadgir district, a village in Yadgit District in Karnataka, India
 Sagara, Kumamoto, a village in Kumamoto Prefecture, Japan
 Sagara, Shizuoka, a village in Shizuoka Prefecture, Japan
 Sagara (Tanzanian ward), an administrative ward in Tanzania

See also
 Sagar (disambiguation)

Japanese-language surnames

ru:Сагара (значения)